Cottonwood Falls Airport  is a city-owned, public-use airport located one nautical mile (2 km) south of the central business district of Cottonwood Falls, a city in Chase County, Kansas, United States. It was formerly known as Chase County Airport.

Facilities and aircraft 
Cottonwood Falls Airport covers an area of 33 acres (13 ha) at an elevation of 1,273 feet (388 m) above mean sea level. It has one runway designated 17/35 with a turf surface measuring 2,300 by 155 feet (701 x 47 m).

For the 12-month period ending September 24, 2009, the airport had 1,150 aircraft operations, an average of 95 per month: 96% general aviation and 4% military.
At that time there were 3 aircraft based at this airport: 67% single-engine and 33% ultralight.

References

External links 
 Cottonwood Falls Airport at Kansas DOT Airport Directory 
 Aerial image as of March 1996 from USGS The National Map
 

Airports in Kansas
Buildings and structures in Chase County, Kansas